National Videogame Museum may refer to:

 National Videogame Museum (United States)
 National Videogame Museum (United Kingdom)
 National Videogame Museum (The Netherlands)

See also 
 List of video game museums